Thanasimus undatulus is a species of checkered beetle in the family Cleridae. It is found in Central America and North America.

Subspecies
These two subspecies belong to the species Thanasimus undatulus:
 Thanasimus undatulus nubilus (Klug, 1842)
 Thanasimus undatulus undatulus (Say, 1835)

References

Further reading

 

Clerinae
Articles created by Qbugbot
Beetles described in 1835